Paul Béchard (25 December 1899, Alès – 26 April 1982) was a French politician. He represented the French Section of the Workers' International (SFIO) in the Constituent Assembly elected in 1945, in the National Assembly from 1946 to 1948, from 1951 to 1955 and from 1958 to 1967 and in the Senate from 1955 to 1958. From January 27, 1948 to May 24, 1951 he was Governor of French West Africa. He was the mayor of Alès from 1947 to 1948 and from 1953 to 1965.

References

1899 births
1982 deaths
People from Alès
French Section of the Workers' International politicians
Members of the Constituent Assembly of France (1945)
Deputies of the 1st National Assembly of the French Fourth Republic
Deputies of the 2nd National Assembly of the French Fourth Republic
French Senators of the Fourth Republic
Senators of Gard
Deputies of the 1st National Assembly of the French Fifth Republic
Deputies of the 2nd National Assembly of the French Fifth Republic
Mayors of places in Occitania (administrative region)
French Army officers
École Spéciale Militaire de Saint-Cyr alumni
French military personnel of World War I
French military personnel of World War II
French Resistance members